Mugulbu is a village also politically known as Development area few kilometres to Mubi, the village is surrounded with some Small villages of Muda, Mbilla, Parnyel, Buladega and Muchami.

References

Populated places in Adamawa State